LATAM Cargo Colombia (formerly known as Línea Aérea Carguera de Colombia S.A. or LANCO for short) is a Colombian cargo airline based in Bogotá with its main base at El Dorado International Airport. LANCO operated under its own branding for a brief period in 2009, when it was changed to the appearance of sister company LAN Cargo.

It is a sister company of LATAM Cargo Brasil and LATAM Cargo Chile.

Destinations

LATAM Cargo Colombia serves the following as of November 2022:

Fleet

Current fleet

As of July 2022, the LATAM Cargo Colombia fleet consists of the following aircraft:

Former fleet
The airline previously operated the following aircraft:

See also
List of airlines of Colombia

References

External links

Airlines of Colombia
Airlines established in 2009
Colombia
Colombian companies established in 2009